The British Independent Film Award for Best Director is an annual award given by the British Independent Film Awards (BIFA) to recognize the best directing in a British independent film. The award was first presented in the 1998 ceremony being Ken Loach the first recipient of this award for his work in the film My Name is Joe.

Stephen Daldry and Andrea Arnold are the only directors who have received this award more than once, with two wins each while Ken Loach hold the record of most nominations for this category with five.

Winners and nominees

1990s

2000s

2010s

2020s

Multiple nominations

5 nominations
 Ken Loach
4 nominations
 Shane Meadows
 Michael Winterbottom
 Stephen Daldry
 Mike Leigh

3 nominations
 Lynne Ramsay
 David Mackenzie
 Ben Wheatley

2 nominations
 Sarah Gavron
 Anand Tucker
 Bart Layton
 Steve McQueen
 Yorgos Lanthimos
 Danny Boyle
 Andrea Arnold
 Asif Kapadia
 Jonathan Glazer
 Paweł Pawlikowski
 Armando Iannucci
 Andrew Haigh
 Kevin Macdonald

Multiple wins

2 wins
 Stephen Daldry
 Andrea Arnold

References

External links
 Official website

British Independent Film Awards